Joan Regan (born Joan Bethel or Siobhan Bethel; 19 January 1928 – 12 September 2013) was an English traditional pop music singer, popular during the 1950s and early 1960s.

Biography
Regan was born in either Romford, Essex, or West Ham, London, (sources disagree) the youngest of six children to Irish parents. She had rheumatic fever as a child which left her with a damaged mitral valve, although this did not cause problems until she was in her seventies. 

Regan married an American serviceman, Dick Howell, a friend of her brothers who met in the Navy. She and Howell married on her 18th birthday in 1946. For a time they lived in Burbank, California. They had three children, one of whom died at an early age. The marriage eventually broke down. Regan, a Catholic, was able to obtain a legal dissolution, rather than a divorce. Before becoming a singer, Regan worked at a number of jobs, including re-touching photographs. Her successful singing career began in 1953, when she made a demo record of "Too Young" and "I'll Walk Alone". The demo came to the attention of Bernard Delfont, and that helped her sign a recording contract with Decca Records. 

She had a number of Top 40 hits for the label, many of them were cover versions of American hits. Among them were Teresa Brewer's "Ricochet", "Till I Waltz Again with You", and "Jilted", Doris Day's "If I Give My Heart to You" and Jill Corey's "Cleo and Me-O" and "Love Me to Pieces".

Beginning on November 18, 1953, she became the resident singer on BBC producer Richard Afton's television series Quite Contrary. Afton later replaced Regan with Ruby Murray as resident vocalist beginning with the show on June 23, 1954. She appeared on the Six-Five Special, and was given her own BBC television series, Be My Guest, which ran for four series starting in 1959. 

After being knocked out by a descending safety curtain during her first appearance in variety, she developed her act to include impressions of Judy Garland, Dame Gracie Fields and Dame Anna Neagle, to the last of whom she bore a facial resemblance.

In the late 1950s, she appeared several times at the London Palladium, including the Royal Command Performance in 1955 and also in the show Stars in Your Eyes with Cliff Richard, Russ Conway and Edmund Hockridge which ran for a 6-month season at the Palladium in 1960. In 1958, she appeared as herself in the film Hello London.

On leaving Decca in 1958, she signed with EMI's HMV label, where she had a Top 10 hit with a cover version of the McGuire Sisters' "May You Always". Two years later, she left EMI for Pye Records, and had two minor record successes, ("Happy Anniversary" and "Papa Loves Mama").

In July 1957, she married her second husband, Harry Claff, who was the joint general manager and box office manager at the Palladium. In November that year, the Daily Herald reported Regan was to have a baby in February 1958, seven months after the wedding. After receiving "abusive and wounding letters from people who were personally unknown to her", Regan successfully sued the newspaper for libel; her daughter, Donna, was actually born in April 1958. Claff and Regan divorced in 1963 after Claff was sentenced to prison for embezzlement of £62,000. He served five years in prison. His defence was that he had only "borrowed" some money from the London Palladium, where he was box-office manager, and would have paid it back. By this time, the hits had dried up and she suffered a nervous breakdown. Regan married her third and last husband, Dr. Martin Cowan, a medical doctor, at Caxton Hall, London on September 12, 1966. After Dr. Cowan's retirement, they moved to Florida in 1982.

In the United States, Regan recorded two singles for Columbia (one of which, "Don't Talk To Me About Love", went on to become a Northern soul classic). In 1984 she slipped in the shower, hit her head on the tiles and suffered a brain haemorrhage. After an emergency operation she was left paralysed and speechless. Her recovery, which entailed much physical and speech therapy, was aided by her miming to her old records. It took many months of treatment before she regained the ability to sing. In 1987, some of those old tracks, together with others by Dickie Valentine, Lita Roza and Jimmy Young, were issued on the double album, Unchained Melodies.

In 1988, she returned to the UK where, with the help and encouragement of Russ Conway, who had been her rehearsal pianist in the early 1950s, she returned to the stage. She recorded for Nectar Records from 1989 to 1996, for whom she recorded a single "You Needed Me" and two albums, The Joan Regan Collection and Remember I Love You.

Later years and death
Regan continued singing, entertaining and supporting her charities (including the Not Forgotten Association) to the age of 82. She died on 12 September 2013, aged 85. She was survived by her three children.

Discography

Albums 
The Girl Next Door (Decca, 1954)
Just Joan (Decca, 1956)
Joan and Ted (with Edmund Hockridge) (Pye-Nixa, 1961)
The World of Joan Regan (Decca, 1976)
Remember I Love You (Nectar Music, 1996)
The Best of Joan Regan (Pulse, 1999)
The Best of Joan Regan (Spectrum Music, 2001)
Soft Sands – Decca Singles (Vocalion, 2004)

Singles

Songs
Regan recorded a number of other songs, including "It's a Big, Wide, Wonderful World" and "That Old Feeling".

See also
List of artists under the Decca Records label

References

External links
Joan Regan at the Robert Farnon Society

1928 births
2013 deaths
Traditional pop music singers
English women singers
English stage actresses
Musicians from Kent
Pye Records artists
People from Romford
Northern soul musicians
English people of Irish descent
Decca Records artists
Musicians from London
Actresses from Kent
The Squadronaires members